Iracema Trevisan Carneiro (born 28 September 1982 in Poços de Caldas, Minas Gerais), also known as Ira, is a Brazilian designer. She was the bassist for Brazilian indie-electro band CSS.

She studied fashion design at college and worked as style assistant for designer Alexandre Herchcovitch in São Paulo before joining CSS.

She left the band in April 2008. Now living in Paris, she continues her career as a designer, working with Augmented Reality and textile design. She has founded a brand of scarves, Heart Heart Heart and Sun Creative Studio.  
She graduated the IFM fashion design program.

References

1981 births
Living people
Brazilian bass guitarists
Brazilian emigrants to France
Brazilian fashion designers
Women bass guitarists
People from Minas Gerais
CSS (band) members
21st-century women musicians
21st-century bass guitarists
Brazilian women fashion designers